Geniostoma stipulare is a species of plant in the Loganiaceae family. It is endemic to Fiji.

References

Endemic flora of Fiji
stipulare
Endangered plants
Taxonomy articles created by Polbot